Durlabharaja may refer to:

 Durlabharaja I (r. c. 784-809 CE), Shakambhari Chahamana king of India
 Durlabharaja II (r. c. 998-1012 CE), Shakambhari Chahamana king of India
 Durlabharaja (Chaulukya dynasty) (r. c. 1008-1022), Chaulukya (Solanki) king of India
 Durlabharaja III (r. c. 1065-1070 CE), Shakambhari Chahamana king of India